"Twice As Hard" is a song by the American southern rock band The Black Crowes. From on their first album, Shake Your Money Maker, the song was released as a single in 1990 and reached the 11th position in the Mainstream Rock charts.

A music video directed by Pete Angelus was shot in 1990 to promote the single. It features the band playing the song at night in a mansion. The band is also shown having a daytime lunch during the guitar solo.

In addition to being the first track on Shake Your Money Maker, "Twice As Hard" is also included on the Crowes' Greatest Hits 1990–1999: A Tribute to a Work in Progress greatest hits compilation. The song is in the key of G major.

In other media
In 1998 the song was performed on the Jools Holland show with Kelly Jones of the Stereophonics.
"Twice As Hard" is used in the movies Mad Dog and Glory and Ladder 49.

References

1990 singles
The Black Crowes songs
1990 songs
Songs written by Chris Robinson (singer)
Songs written by Rich Robinson